Antonín Šetela (12 April 1882, date of death unknown) was a Czech footballer who played as a forward.

Club career
During his playing career, Šetela played for Smíchov.

International career
On 1 April 1906, Šetela made his debut for Bohemia in Bohemia's second game, starting in a 1–1 draw against Hungary. In the 63rd minute, Šetela assisted Jindřich Valášek to score Bohemia's second international goal. It was Šetela's only cap for Bohemia.

Notes

References

1880s births
Date of birth unknown
Footballers from Prague
Association football forwards
Czech footballers
Bohemia international footballers
Sportspeople from the Austro-Hungarian Empire